Lysimachia ephemerum, the willow-leaved loosestrife or milky loosestrife, is a species of flowering plant in the primrose family Primulaceae, native to France, Spain, Portugal and Morocco. Against grey-green foliage this hardy herbaceous perennial bears erect racemes of delicate white flowers with purple stamens on  stems in early summer. It is cultivated as an ornamental plant, and holds the Royal Horticultural Society's Award of Garden Merit. It requires a position in full sun, and reliably moist soil.

References

ephemerum
Flora of France
Flora of Morocco
Flora of Portugal
Flora of Spain